Iran Darroudi (2 September 1936 – 29 October 2021) was an Iranian contemporary artist. Her art consists of surreal paintings dealing with Iranian themed imagery and strong lighting. She lived between Tehran and Paris for many years.

Early life 
Born in Mashhad, Iran, to a family consisting of traders from Khorasan on her father's side and on her mother's side the family were Caucasian merchants who had settled in Mashhad. Her family moved to Hamburg, Germany, for her father's business, in 1937, and by the early 1940s they were forced to leave because of the beginnings of World War II. By 1945 her family returned to Mashhad.

Darroudi studied at École Nationale Supérieure des Beaux-Arts and the history of art at the École du Louvre, both in Paris, France, stained glass at the Royal Academy of Brussels, in Brussels, Belgium, and television direction and production at the RCA Institute in New York City.

Career 
Darroudi’s paintings are defined as Surrealist works. She was able to combine the delicacy and romantic spirit of Persian paintings with the elements of Surrealism. 

Darroudi's first solo exhibition was held in Miami, Miami-Dade County, Florida, in 1958 at the invitation of the Florida State Art Center.

She wrote articles on the history of art and art criticism for the conservative Iranian newspaper, Kayhan.

In 1968, she made a 55 minute long documentary about the 1968 Venice Biennial. She was appointed an honorary professor at the Industrial University of Tehran, teaching art history. In 1969 the ITT Corporation commissioned her to paint Iranian Oil. She held exhibitions in Paris and at the Atrium Artist Gallery, Geneva, and a month later at Galarie 21, Zürich.

In 1976, she exhibited at the Mexican Museum of Art, where Spanish painter Antonio Rodríguez Luna praised her as one of the world's four greatest painters.

In 1978, she moved to France. Later, she lived between Paris, France, and Tehran, Iran.

In 2009, a documentary Iran Darroudi: The Painter of Ethereal Moments produced by Bahman Maghsoudlou, focused on the life and art of Darroudi.

Personal life and death
In New York City, she met and married Parviz Moghadasi in 1966, who was studying television direction. The couple worked at the newly established Iranian television organization as producer and director for six years.

Her husband Parviz Moghadasi died in 1985. On 29 October 2021, at the age of 85, Darroudi died in Tehran of cardiac arrest after a three-month battle with COVID-19.

Works

Select solo exhibitions 
 1958 - Florida State University, Miami, Florida
 1960 - Farhang Hall, Tehran, Iran

Bibliography

References

External links
 Iran Darroudi's Official Website
 

1936 births
2021 deaths
Deaths from the COVID-19 pandemic in Iran
20th-century Iranian women artists
21st-century Iranian women artists
Iranian painters
People from Mashhad
École du Louvre alumni
Iranian biographers
Iranian women painters